George Rakotoarimbelo is a Malagasy Olympic boxer. He represented his country in the light flyweight class at the 2004 Summer Olympics. He lost his initial bout against Azerbaijani boxer Fuad Aslanov.

References

Living people
Malagasy male boxers
Olympic boxers of Madagascar
Boxers at the 2004 Summer Olympics
Year of birth missing (living people)
Light-flyweight boxers